Claire is the debut studio album by English actress and singer Claire Sweeney, released by Telstar Records in 2002. It reached number 15 on the UK Albums Chart.

Track listing

Charts

References

2002 debut albums
Telstar Records albums
Covers albums